Whirinaki River is the name of two rivers in New Zealand's North Island:
 Whirinaki River (Hawke's Bay)
 Whirinaki River (Northland)